The Northland Bank was an Alberta-based Canadian bank that failed in 1985. It was incorporated in 1974.  It failed and was closed by the Canadian government shortly after the failure, also in 1985, of the Canadian Commercial Bank.  The failures of both banks were the subject of a Commission of Inquiry headed by Supreme Court of Canada Justice Willard Estey, who issued his report in 1986.

References

Further reading

Banks established in 1974
Defunct banks of Canada
Bank failures
Banks disestablished in 1985
1974 establishments in Alberta
1985 disestablishments in Alberta
Canadian companies disestablished in 1985
Canadian companies established in 1974